Tara Chand is a politician and Dalit leader from Jammu and Kashmir. He was Deputy Chief Minister of Jammu and Kashmir from 2009 to 2014. He had earlier served as the Speaker of the Jammu and Kashmir Legislative Assembly. On 30 August 2022, he resigned from Indian National Congress in support of Ghulam Nabi Azad. He was appointed as Vice chairperson for Democratic Azad Party. On 22 December 2022, he was removed from Democratic Azad Party after the allegations of 'anti-party'activities.

In 2014 elections, Chand lost to BJP candidate Dr Krishan Lal in Chhamb Assembly constituency of Jammu district. On 30 August 2022, he quit Congress in support of Ghulam Nabi Azad.

References

1963 births
Living people
Speakers of the Jammu and Kashmir Legislative Assembly
Deputy chief ministers of Jammu and Kashmir
People from Jammu district
Jammu and Kashmir MLAs 2008–2014